Daviesia megacalyx is a species of flowering plant in the family Fabaceae and is endemic to a restricted part of the south-west of Western Australia. It is an erect, glabrous shrub with scattered, leathery, elliptic phyllodes and apricot-coloured and deep pink flowers.

Description

Taxonomy and naming
Daviesia megacalyx was first formally described in 1995 by Michael Crisp in Australian Systematic Botany from specimens collected near  Ravensthorpe in 1979. The specific epithet (megacalyx) means "large calyx", referring to the sepals.

Distribution and habitat
This daviesia grows in mallee-heath and dense shrubland near Ravensthorpe in the Esperance Plains biogeographic region of south-western Western Australia.

Conservation status
Daviesia megacalyx is listed as "endangered" under the Australian Government Environment Protection and Biodiversity Conservation Act 1999 and as "Threatened Flora (Declared Rare Flora — Extant)" by the Department of Biodiversity, Conservation and Attractions. The main threats to the species include inappropriate fire regimes, habitat loss and degradation by mining activities and dieback caused by Phytophthora.

References

megacalyx
Eudicots of Western Australia
Plants described in 1995
Taxa named by Michael Crisp